Gondwana Visapur railway station (station code: GNVR) is a railway station on New Delhi–Chennai main line in Nagpur CR railway division of Central Railway zone of Indian Railways. It also lies on Gondia–Nagbhid–Balharshah line in Nagpur SEC railway division of South East Central Railway zone of Indian Railways. It serves Visapur, a village in Chandrapur district in Maharashtra State in India. It is located at 198 m above sea level and has 2 platforms. Only passenger trains stop at this station.

References

Railway stations in Chandrapur district
Nagpur CR railway division
Nagpur SEC railway division